Peel Forest is a small community in the Canterbury region of New Zealand. The town features a Cafe & Bar, a camping ground and an outdoor recreation facility. Popular activities include camping and tramping in the area, rafting and kayaking on the nearby Rangitata and Orari rivers and four-wheel-drive tours to nearby Lord of the Rings film locations.

History 
According to Māori culture the large totara trees located in the forest are the tamariki (children) of Tarahaoa and Huatekerekere whom themselves turned into Mount Peel and Little Mount Peel upon their deaths. They were both part of Ārai Te Uru's ill-fated trading trip along the Canterbury coast.

The first European to visit the region was Charles Torlesse in 1849 in the search for coal.  Torlesse named the area "Gurdon Forrest" this was later renamed in the memory of Sir Robert Peel by Francis Jollie. The community took off in the 1850s with the rise of the timber industry. Kahikatea, matai and totara were all milled in the region and the remains of the sawpits can still be found at Clarke Flat today. Saw milling continued in the region till after the 1900s. A horrified Arthur Mills who was visiting in 1881, was so taken back by the devastation that he personally purchased 16 hectares of untouched forest.  This would go on to form the beginnings of the Peel Forest Park.

The other source of commerce in the early days was farming. Early runs were set up John B A Acland, Charles G Tripp and Francis Jollie. Acland and Tripp, who in the late 1850s with all of the land on the plains taken, decided to chance their luck further up the foothills. At its largest the partnership held nearly 300,00 acres of land including Mount Peel, Mount Somers, Mount Possession, Orari Gorge and parts of Mesopotamia and Hakatere.

Demographics

Ben McLeod had a population of 132 at the 2018 New Zealand census, a decrease of 30 people (-18.5%) since the 2013 census, and an increase of 21 people (18.9%) since the 2006 census. There were 57 households. There were 75 males and 57 females, giving a sex ratio of 1.32 males per female. The median age was 36.4 years (compared with 37.4 years nationally), with 18 people (13.6%) aged under 15 years, 39 (29.5%) aged 15 to 29, 60 (45.5%) aged 30 to 64, and 15 (11.4%) aged 65 or older.

Ethnicities were 97.7% European/Pākehā, and 6.8% Māori (totals add to more than 100% since people could identify with multiple ethnicities).

The proportion of people born overseas was 18.2%, compared with 27.1% nationally.

Although some people objected to giving their religion, 54.5% had no religion, 34.1% were Christian and 4.5% had other religions.

Of those at least 15 years old, 27 (23.7%) people had a bachelor or higher degree, and 12 (10.5%) people had no formal qualifications. The median income was $28,800, compared with $31,800 nationally. The employment status of those at least 15 was that 69 (60.5%) people were employed full-time, and 15 (13.2%) were part-time.

Education 
Early schools in the region were set up in nearby Scotsburn with the school being moved to Peel Forest in 1923.  The school was closed in 1998 and students transferred to Carew Peel Forest School. The school buildings are currently used as a Montessori pre-school.

Buildings

St Stephen's Church 
Located on the main street the first church was built in 1868.  A whirlwind destroyed the original in 1884 with the current church being built in 1885.  The church is well known for its wooden interior and unique New Zealand twist to its traditional stained glass windows.

Notable people
John B A Acland (25 November 1823 – 18 May 1904), politician and early run holder.
Austen Deans (2 December 1915 – 18 October 2011), noted New Zealand based artist who, with his wife and seven sons, lived and worked in Peel Forest.  Deans is known for his traditional landscape paintings depicting the Canterbury high country 
Captain George Hamilton Dennistoun (23 September 1884 – 1977), DSO, OBE.  Born in Peel Forest. Held various command positions throughout World War I and II. 
Jim Dennistoun (7 March 1883 – 9 August 1916), Born in Peel Forest.  First successful ascent of Mt D’Archiac.  Was part of the ill-fated Terra Nova Expedition with Robert Scott. Awarded the King's Antarctic Medal and the medal of the Royal Geographical Society.  Died in World War I in Austria as a POW, Dennistoun Glacier in Antarctica was named after him. 
Francis Jollie (1815 – 30 November 1870), Member of Parliament (1861–1870)
Dame Ngaio Marsh (23 April 1895 – 18 February 1982), famous crime writer.  Buried at the Church of the Holy Innocents. 
Charles G Tripp (1 July 1826 – 6 July 1897), early run holder.

References

External links
Peel Forest Outdoor Pursuits Centre
The Green Man at Peel Forest Cafe & Bar

High Country stations
Timaru District
Populated places in Canterbury, New Zealand